Saints Peter and Paul Jesuit Church is a Roman Catholic church located at 629 East Jefferson Avenue in Detroit, Michigan. It is the oldest existing church in the city of Detroit, and was listed on the National Register of Historic Places and designated a Michigan State Historic Site in 1971.

History
In 1844, Bishop Peter Paul Lefevere, who served as coadjutor bishop of the Diocese of Detroit, began construction on Saints Peter and Paul Cathedral; the cornerstone is dated June 29, 1844. Francis Letourneau drew the plans and Peter Kindenkens supervised the construction. Construction was completed over four years, as the bishop paid for each stage of construction with cash. The church was consecrated on June 29, 1848 as the cathedral church of the diocese. /> The original parishioners were predominantly Irish, with some French families attending.

Following Lefevere's death, under Caspar Borgess, the second Bishop of Detroit, the church remained the cathedral until 1877, when he gave the title to the building to the Jesuit Order with the intention of starting Detroit's first Catholic college. The church then became SS. Peter & Paul Jesuit Church. The Jesuit college eventually became the University of Detroit-Mercy, and UDM's law school still occupies the building adjacent to the church.

The church was altered in 1879 and 1882, completely renovated in 1892, and remodeled again in 1911. A chapel was added to the rear of the building in 1918. Although these alterations changed the look of the church, the original plan has been substantially preserved. The church is still in use, offering Sunday and some weekday masses.

Description
Saints Peter and Paul Church is a three-aisled church, built of Detroit common brick. The front façade is gabled and topped by a short square belfry. The tower was originally intended to support a tall spire, which was never built. There is a central entrance pavilion, set between arched windows and Ionic pilasters. The pilasters continue along the side, separating the side elevation into seven bays with tall, rounded arch windows. A heavy frieze surmounts the walls.

The interior of the church features hand-carved oak confessionals, a barrel vaulted ceiling painted with murals of the apostles, and an extraordinary Carrara marble altar designed by Gustav Adolph Mueller and featuring a bas relief of the crucifixion by Joseph Sibbel. These details were added during later renovations; the organ case is the only surviving original element.

Gallery

See also
List of Catholic cathedrals in the United States
List of cathedrals in the United States

References

External links
Ss. Peter and Paul Jesuit Church

Peter
Irish-American culture in Michigan
Churches in the Roman Catholic Archdiocese of Detroit
Roman Catholic churches completed in 1848
19th-century Roman Catholic church buildings in the United States
Churches on the National Register of Historic Places in Michigan
Michigan State Historic Sites in Wayne County, Michigan
National Register of Historic Places in Detroit
Roman Catholic cathedrals in Michigan
Romanesque Revival architecture in Michigan
1848 establishments in Michigan